The Indiana Central Canal was a canal intended to connect the Wabash and Erie Canal to the Ohio River. It was funded by the Mammoth Internal Improvement Act, Indiana's attempt to take part in the canal-building craze started by the Erie Canal. $3.5 million was allocated for the project, the largest piece of the entire $10 million Act. However, due to the Panic of 1837, Indiana suffered financial difficulties and had to turn the canal over to the state's creditors, and building of the canal was stopped in 1839. The canal was supposed to extend , from Peru, Indiana, to Evansville, Indiana, where it would reach the Ohio River. It was originally divided into two sections, North and South. Later, a third section was designated, called the Indianapolis section. Only  were completed, with an additional  between Anderson, Indiana, and Martinsville, Indiana, having been partially built.

History
Prior to its construction, the canal path was surveyed by Jesse Williams, the canal engineer of Indiana. The state of Indiana already owned most of the land required for the canal.

The northern section was from Peru to Broad Ripple, Indiana. It was surveyed primarily by William Goody. It was to use the Mississinewa River to Alexandria, Indiana, and then parallel the White River. Only Delaware and Madison counties saw significant progress, which consisted of limited digging.

The eight fully completed miles were entirely within the Indianapolis section, continuing to parallel the White River. This section consisted of  that were dug and watered, from Waverly, Indiana, to Broad Ripple, where the construction began. Because the land was undeveloped, construction between Broad Ripple and downtown Indianapolis was difficult.

In the last half of the 19th century, various water companies used the section to power the water system in Indianapolis, which used purified well water and not canal water. In 1904, the Indianapolis Water Company (IWC) finally took advantage of the partially built canal as a source for a purification plant. In the late 1960s, construction of Interstate 65 forced a section of the canal underground and by 1969 the IWC had ceased using it as a source of power for its West Washington Street pumping station. Subsequently, In 1976, the IWC deeded the canal south of 16th Street to the city of Indianapolis. The city later undertook a project, beginning in 1985, to drain, rebuild, lower, and then restore water to the remaining downtown section of the canal. Some of that portion of the Central Canal is now within White River State Park as well as running through the Indiana Government Center.

The southern section was from Port Royal (now Waverly) to Evansville. It was primarily surveyed by Francis Cleveland. The  attempted were in Vanderburgh and Warrick counties.

The Central Canal Towpath of Indianapolis follows along a portion of the completed eight miles. It runs from Broad Ripple to 30th Street near Riverside Park and passes by Butler University and the Indianapolis Museum of Art.

Six different species of turtle populate the Indianapolis section, and are studied to see how urban environments affect wildlife.

In 1971, the canal was designated by the American Water Works Association as an American Water Landmark.

Gallery

See also

Indiana Mammoth Improvement Act
Transportation in Indianapolis
White River State Park

References
Notes

External links

Canal Society of Indiana
Indianapolis Canal Walk.org
Central Canal Towpath

Canals in Indiana
Parks in Indianapolis
White River State Park
Historic American Engineering Record in Indiana
History of Indianapolis
Indiana Historical Society
Transportation buildings and structures in Marion County, Indiana